Martinho Martins Mukana (born 5 July 1982), known as Paíto, is a Mozambican former professional footballer who played as a left-back.

Club career
Born in Maputo, Paíto began his senior career at Sporting CP. He became a regular in the 2004–05 season after being granted Portuguese citizenship and, on 26 January 2005, scored his only goal for the Lions in a 3–3 draw against S.L. Benfica in the sixth round of the Taça de Portugal (penalty shootout loss), in a solo effort.

After the arrival in January 2006, on loan from Valencia CF, of Portuguese international Marco Caneira, Paíto was deemed surplus to requirements and left, also loaned, to Vitória de Guimarães. He was an undisputed starter during his short tenure, as the Minho team eventually dropped down a level.

Purchased by La Liga club RCD Mallorca, Paíto immediately returned to Portugal, being loaned to S.C. Braga for the duration of the campaign. Released by the Balearic Islands side without making any official appearances, he joined FC Sion on a three-year contract.

After three solid seasons in the Swiss Super League, Paíto stayed in Switzerland, signing with fellow league team Neuchâtel Xamax FCS. After the latter went bankrupt, in January 2012 he joined FC Vaslui from Romania, reuniting with former Sporting coach Augusto Inácio.

Paíto spent the first half of the following campaign without a club, signing in early January 2013 with Skoda Xanthi FC. He made his Super League Greece debut on the 27th, playing the full 90 minutes in a 1–0 away win over PAOK FC.

International career
Paíto started representing Mozambique at age 20. He was recalled in April for the 2002 COSAFA Cup, nearly two years after his last international. Additionally, he took part in the 2003 COSAFA Cup, the 2006 FIFA World Cup 2006 World Cup qualification, the 2004 COSAFA Cup, 2008 Africa Cup of Nations qualification and the 2010 World Cup qualifiers.

Personal life
His son, Edson Mucuana, is also a professional footballer, and currently plays for Vilafranquense.

Honours
Sporting CP
Taça de Portugal: 2001–02

Sion
Swiss Cup: 2008–09

References

External links

1982 births
Living people
Sportspeople from Maputo
Mozambican footballers
Association football defenders
Primeira Liga players
Segunda Divisão players
Sporting CP B players
Sporting CP footballers
Vitória S.C. players
S.C. Braga players
RCD Mallorca players
Swiss Super League players
FC Sion players
Neuchâtel Xamax FCS players
Liga I players
FC Vaslui players
Super League Greece players
Xanthi F.C. players
Mozambique international footballers
2010 Africa Cup of Nations players
Mozambican expatriate footballers
Expatriate footballers in Portugal
Expatriate footballers in Switzerland
Expatriate footballers in Romania
Expatriate footballers in Greece
Mozambican expatriate sportspeople in Portugal
Mozambican expatriate sportspeople in Romania
Mozambican expatriate sportspeople in Greece